MD 80 may refer to:

 McDonnell Douglas MD-80
 Maryland Route 80